DZME (1530 AM) is a radio station owned and operated by Capitol Broadcasting Center in the Philippines. The station's studio is located at Unit 1802, 18/F, OMM-Citra Building, San Miguel Ave., Ortigas Center, Pasig and its transmitter is located at #78 Flamengco St., Brgy. Panghulo, Obando, Bulacan. This station operates daily from 4:00 AM to midnight.

History
DZME started its broadcast on June 15, 1968. During the first ten years of operations, the station operated on the frequency of 1540 kHz until November 1978, when it was reassigned on the current frequency of 1530 kHz.

In August 1987, the then former president Corazon Aquino, through the National Telecommunications Commission, ordered to shut down DZME for a few months, on a ground that the national security is at grave risk. The station had gained notoriety for airing controversial right-wing propaganda and commentaries that were critical of Mrs. Aquino's Administration, during a series of unsuccessful coup attempts to topple the administration by the rebel soldiers, but it returned on the air thereafter on January 1, 1988.

In 1996, a new group of investors, including former Surigao del Sur Congressman Prospero Pichay Jr., took over the assets and properties of the radio station from the Luison family.

In 2004, DZME adopted the Radyo Uno brand, coinciding with the acquisition of its Harris transmitter.

In 2009, DZME transferred to its new home at the Victory Central Mall in Monumento, Caloocan from its long-time former studios and transmitter site in Roosevelt Avenue, Quezon City (which is now occupied by the branch of Bank of the Philippine Islands) as part of its plan to expand operations. Regional affiliates had already developed to bolster its nationwide presence, which gave birth to Like Radio News FM network.

From November 2013 to January 2014, some its programs (except for news casts) were temporarily postponed and replaced by music fillers due to technical upgrades & the transfer of the studios to OMM-Citra Building in Ortigas Center, Pasig.

After Holy Week of 2015, the Radyo Uno brand was dropped. In the last quarter of 2016, DZME enhanced its overall programming line-up and revitalizing its news division, as well as the launch of its new programs, with a few of the station's old programs retained.

References

Radio stations in Metro Manila
News and talk radio stations in the Philippines
Radio stations established in 1968